The Battle of Bun Garbhain was a Scottish clan battle fought in 1570, in the Scottish Highlands, between the Clan Cameron and the Clan Mackintosh.

Invasion 
Donald Dubh Cameron, XV Chief of Clan Cameron, died, leaving an infant son, Allan, at the head of the clan. The chief of Clan MacKintosh, leading 200 men, invaded the Cameron lands near Loch Arkaig. A bloody battle ensued.

Battles 
Though outnumbered, the Camerons had the high ground and soon there were many dead and injured from the MacKintoshes.  MacKintosh led his men in retreat around the head of Loch Eil to the Ardgour shore and rallied his men.  The Camerons were in swift pursuit and a second engagement took place, with similar results as the first.  In the midst of this action, the chief of MacKintosh is believed to have been killed by Donald 'Taillear Dubh na Tuaighe' Cameron (son of the XIV Chief of Clan Cameron), with a fearsome Lochaber axe. MacKintosh's followers took their stricken chief and fell back to Bun Garbhain (Bun Garvan). Both sides met once again for an indeterminate time, before disengaging for the night. The MacKintoshes made camp in a small hollow called Cuil nan Cuileag, and thought that they were safe. However, the Camerons stormed the encampment and killed every MacKintosh.

Aftermath 
The mother of Allan Cameron, the infant chief of Clan Cameron, was in fact a MacKintosh. After the battle, Taillear Dubh came to give her an account of the fighting.  Enraged with the news of all the dead MacKintosh, she tried to kill her son, but Taillear Dubh intervened in time.  Allan Cameron was safe, but his mother was banished from Lochaber forever.

References

16th-century Scottish clan battles
1570 in Scotland
Conflicts in 1570